Anjirak (also Romanized as Anjīrak; also known as Injīlak) is a village in Amanabad Rural District, in the Central District of Arak County, Markazi Province, Iran. At the 2006 census, its population was 303, in 86 families.

References 

Populated places in Arak County